Millettia pinnata is a species of tree in the pea family, Fabaceae, native to eastern and tropical Asia, Australia, and Pacific islands. It is often known by the synonym Pongamia pinnata. Its common names include Indian beech and Pongame oiltree.

Description
It may be deciduous for short periods. It has a straight or crooked trunk,  in diameter, with grey-brown bark, which is smooth or vertically fissured. Its wood is white colored. Branches are glabrous with pale stipulate scars. The imparipinnate leaves of the tree alternate and are short-stalked, rounded, or cuneate at the base, ovate or oblong along the length, obtuse-acuminate at the apex, and not toothed on the edges. They are a soft, shiny burgundy when young, and mature to a glossy, deep green as the season progresses, with prominent veins underneath.

Flowering generally starts after 3–4 years with small clusters of white, purple, and pink flowers blossoming throughout the year. The calyx of the flowers is bell-shaped and truncated, while the corolla is a rounded ovate shape with basal auricles and often with a central blotch of green color.

Croppings of indehiscent pods can occur by 4–6 years. The brown seed pods appear immediately after flowering, and mature in 10 to 11 months. The pods are thick-walled, smooth, somewhat flattened, and elliptical, but slightly curved with a short, curved point. The pods contain within them one or two bean-like brownish-red seeds, but because they do not split open naturally, the pods need to decompose before the seeds can germinate.

The species is naturally distributed in tropical and temperate Asia, from India to Japan to Thailand to Malesia to north and north-eastern Australia to some Pacific islands; It has been propagated and distributed further around the world in humid and subtropical environments from sea level to 1,360 m (Chingola, Zambia), although in the Himalayan foothills, it is not found above 600 m.

The tree is well suited to intense heat and sunlight, and its dense network of lateral roots and its thick, long taproot make it drought tolerant. The dense shade it provides slows the evaporation of surface water and its root nodules promote nitrogen fixation, a symbiotic process by which gaseous nitrogen (N2) from the air is converted into ammonium (NH4+, a form of nitrogen available to the plant). M. pinnata is also a freshwater flooded forest species, as it can survive total submergence in water for few months continuously. M. pinnata trees are common in Tonlesap lake swamp forests in Cambodia.

Millettia pinnata is an outbreeding diploid legume tree, with a diploid chromosome number of 22. Root nodules are of the determinate type (as those on soybean and common bean) formed by the causative bacterium Bradyrhizobium.
trad

Distribution 
M. pinnata is broadly distributed across India, Asia, Africa, northern Australia and the Pacific and Caribbean Islands and has been cultivated and transported since the 19th century or earlier. As a result, some literature declares M. pinnata naturalized in Africa and certain parts of the United States, while its status as naturalized or native is uncertain in other regions.

Uses
Millettia pinnata is well-adapted to arid zones, and has many traditional uses. It is often used for landscaping as a windbreak or for shade due to the large canopy and showy, fragrant flowers. The flowers are used by gardeners as compost for plants. The bark can be used to make twine or rope, and it also yields a black gum that has historically been used to treat wounds caused by poisonous fish. The wood is said to be beautifully grained, but splits easily when sawn, thus relegating it to firewood, posts, and tool handles. The tree's deep taproot and drought tolerance makes this tree ideal for controlling soil erosion and binding sand dunes. 

Millettia pinnata seeds generally contain oil (27-39%), protein (17-37%), starch (6-7%), crude fiber (5-7%), moisture (15-20%) and ash content (2-3%). Nearly half of the oil content of M. pinnata seeds is oleic acid. Oil made from the seeds, known as pongamia oil, has been used as lamp oil, in soapmaking, and as a lubricant. The oil has a high content of triglycerides, and its disagreeable taste and odor are due to bitter flavonoid constituents, including karanjin, pongamol, tannin, and karanjachromene. These biocompounds induce nausea and vomiting if ingested in its natural form. The fruits, sprouts and seeds are used in traditional medicine. Rumphius writes the Malaparius (from Moluccan malapari) bark can be used to neutralize eeltail catfish venom, Seram Timur and Banda peoples infuse it with garlic, Cryptocarya massoia and clover to treat beri-beri menyembuhkan sakit beri-beri. People of Grajagan, Banyuwangi, use the bark to treat scabies.

Degani et al have published a review of the applications of M. pinnata. Studies have shown seedlings with tolerance to salinity levels between 12 and 19 dS/m, with an ability to tolerate salinity stresses of 32.5 dS/m.  M. pinnata is therefore capable of using irrigation that is considered saline (>4.7 dS/m) and in soils considered saline (>4 dS/m).

Research

The seed oil has been found to be useful in diesel generators, and along with Jatropha and castor, it is being explored in hundreds of projects throughout India and the third world as feedstock for biodiesel. M. pinnata as a biofuel is commercially valuable to the rural populations of places such as India and Bangladesh, where the plant grows abundantly, because it can support the socioeconomic development of these areas.

Several unelectrified villages have used pongamia oil, simple processing techniques, and diesel generators to create their own grid systems to run water pumps and electric lighting.

Research indicates potential use of M. pinnata as a food source for cattle, sheep and poultry, as its byproduct contains up to 30% protein. A report commissioned and financed by Deutsche Gesellschaft für Internationale Zusammenarbeit (GIZ) GmbH found that the protein-rich byproduct can be free from alkaloids and therefore a dietary source of protein for humans.

See also
 Solar power in India

References

pinnata
Flora of the Indian subcontinent
Flora of Southeast Asia
Flora of Japan
Flora of Taiwan
Flora of Malesia
Flora of Papuasia
Flora of Melanesia
Flora of the Northern Territory
Flora of Queensland
Fabales of Asia
Fabales of Australia
Taxa named by Carl Linnaeus
Plants described in 1989
Biofuel in India
Biodiesel feedstock sources
Sustainable agriculture